LP-211 is a drug which acts as a potent and selective agonist at the 5HT7 serotonin receptor, with better brain penetration than older 5-HT7 agonists in the same series, and similar effects in animals.

See also
 AS-19
 E-55888
 LP-12
 LP-44

References

5-HT7 agonists
Piperazines